William Stevens may refer to:

 William Stevens (MP) for Salisbury
 William Stevens (writer) (1732–1807), English biographer
 William A. Stevens (1879–1941), New Jersey Attorney General
 William C. Stevens (Michigan politician) (1837-1921), Michigan Auditor General
 William C. Stevens (New York politician) (1848–1897), American merchant and politician from New York
 William Bacon Stevens (1815–1887), Episcopal bishop of Pennsylvania
 William George Stevens (1893–1975), British born general who served with the New Zealand Military Forces during WWII
 William H. Stevens (1818–1880), American architect
 William L. Stevens (1932–1997), Episcopal bishop of Fond du Lac
 William N. Stevens (1850–1889), first African American to serve in both house of the Virginia General Assembly
 William Oliver Stevens (1878–1955), American writer and professor for the United States Naval Academy
 W. Richard Stevens (1951–1999), American technology writer
 William S. Stevens (1948–2008), attorney who wrote The Common Law Origins of the Infield Fly Rule
 William W. Stevens, one of the founders of Triad Systems Corporation, now known as Activant
 Billy Stevens (born 1945), American football player
 Billy Stevens (Australian footballer) (1905–1997), Australian rules footballer for St Kilda
 Bill Stevens (footballer, born 1908) (1908–1981), Australian rules footballer for North Melbourne
 Bill Stevens (footballer, born 1939), Australian rules footballer for Fitzroy
 Will Stevens (born 1991), British racing driver
 Will Henry Stevens (1881–1949), American modernist painter and naturalist
 Mark Stevens (actor) (Richard William Stevens, 1916–1994), American actor

See also
 William Stephens (disambiguation)